"When the Sun Goes Down" is a song by English indie rock band Arctic Monkeys. It was released on 16 January 2006 as the second single from their debut studio album, Whatever People Say I Am, That's What I'm Not (2006). It followed debut single "I Bet You Look Good on the Dancefloor" to number one on the UK Singles Chart.

The song is about prostitution in the Neepsend district of Sheffield. Originally known as "Scummy", early reports had also suggested its name would be simply "Sun Goes Down", but the full name was confirmed on Arctic Monkeys' website.

Content
The song's lyrics tell a story narrated from the point of view of a concerned individual who is approached by a scantily-clad girl, heavily implied to be a prostitute; he then observes a "scummy man"  who has been hanging around the neighbourhood; the man is implied to be either the prostitute's pimp or a 'client' who is picking her up for sex. This section of the song musically consists of just vocalist Alex Turner singing accompanied by a pattern of electric guitar chords with a conspicuously clean tone. After the line "I said he's a scumbag don't you know" the song then changes drastically into a heavy rock style with a fast beat and driving guitar riff which is also played identically on the bass guitar. In the song's lyrics, now delivered a lot more venomously, the prostitute propositions the song's narrator and he turns her down politely; he then observes the "scummy man" arriving to pick her up in a Ford Mondeo. The girl is "delighted when she sees him" because "she must be fucking freezing, scantily clad beneath the clear night sky".

The song's chorus consists of the repeated line "they said it changes when the sun goes down around here", noting the stark difference between the appearance of the city at daytime and the dark prostitution trade the narrator observes at night. After the second refrain of the chorus, the song reverts to the style of the introduction. The last line, "I hope you're not involved at all", is either the narrator expressing his disappointment that the girl has turned to prostitution or a warning to the person to whom the narrator is telling the story, who also may be involved with the scummy man – or the listener themselves.

The line "and he told Roxanne to put on her red light" is a reference to The Police song "Roxanne", which is also about prostitution.

Music video
The song's music video was directed by Paul Fraser and premiered on MTV2 on 21 December 2005. It starred Lauren Socha and Stephen Graham. The video used footage from a longer film, Scummy Man, which used the same actors who appeared in the music video to tell the story of 'Nina', the nameless "that girl there" from the song.

Track listings

Personnel

Arctic Monkeys
Alex Turner – lead vocals, lead guitar
Jamie Cook – rhythm guitar, backing vocals
Andy Nicholson – bass guitar, backing vocals
Matt Helders – drums

Technical
Simon 'Barny' Barnicott – mixing
Ewan Davies – recording
Owen Skinner – mixing assistance
Alan Smyth – additional recording

Charts

Weekly charts

Year-end charts

Certifications

Release history

References

External links
 Arctic Monkeys Worldtour 2006 Mapped on Platial.
  Music video

2005 singles
Arctic Monkeys songs
Number-one singles in Scotland
UK Singles Chart number-one singles
Songs written by Alex Turner (musician)
2005 songs
Domino Recording Company singles
Song recordings produced by Jim Abbiss
Songs about prostitutes